Sammy Sanders (born July 17, 1967) is a part-time NASCAR driver from Mount Juliet, Tennessee. He drives the #04 Camp Courageous Dodge for Bobby Hamilton Racing on occasion in the Craftsman Truck Series. He has a couple of Busch Series starts in his career as well.

Racing career

Busch Series
Sanders has made three NASCAR Busch Series starts in his career, all of which came in the 2001 series. Driving for Day Racing Enterprises, Sanders started 38th at Rockingham in his debut. He would finish the race, despite being twelve laps down in 36th. Then, Sanders went to Las Vegas and Bristol. It was the same song both times, as Sanders started and finished 41st falling out of the event early.

Craftsman Truck Series
Sanders started 34th at Kentucky Speedway in 2001, his first career race in NASCAR Craftsman Truck Series. Driving for Bobby Hamilton Racing, Sanders would finish 34th with electrical problems. Sanders would make one more start for BHR in 2001, finishing 31st at Nazareth. Then, Sanders moved to Team Rensi Motorsports for the 2001 finale at California. It was a poor showing, though, for Sanders' team after an engine forced him to last (36th) in the event.

Sanders returned to the series in 2004, driving for Harris Trucking Motorsports at Texas Motor Speedway. Starting the event in 35th, Sanders finished his first race in good fashion, on the lead lap. Sanders would go on to finish twenty-second in the event.

In 2006, Bobby Hamilton Racing announced that Sanders would drive the #04 Dodge in three events through the 2006. He earned a career best 30th place start in his season debut at Nashville and then finished 25th. As stated, Sanders will be in two more races on the year.

ARCA Racing Series
Sanders attempted 4 races in the ARCA Bondo/Mar-Hyde Series in the 2000 season, driving the No. 31 Chevrolet but he failed to qualify in all of them.

NASCAR Southeast Series
Sanders attempted 4 races in the NASCAR Southeast Series, all of them in his home track, at Nashville Fairgrounds, he failed to qualify in 1992, and made the event in 1995, 1996 and 2000. His best finish was 20th in 2000.

References

External links
 

NASCAR drivers
ARCA Menards Series drivers
People from Mount Juliet, Tennessee
Living people
Racing drivers from Nashville, Tennessee
Racing drivers from Tennessee
1967 births